{{DISPLAYTITLE:Omega1 Cygni}}

Omega1 Cygni, Latinized from ω1 Cygni, is the Bayer designation for a solitary star in the northern constellation of Cygnus. It is visible to the naked eye with an apparent visual magnitude of 4.94.

This is a somewhat evolved B-type subgiant star with a stellar classification of B2.5 IV. Telting and colleagues report it as a Beta Cephei variable with a high degree of confidence as they found regular pulsations in its spectrum in a high-resolution spectroscopy study published in 2006. Its brightness varies irregularly by 0.034 magnitude every 1.137 days.

See also
Omega2 Cygni

References

B-type subgiants
Beta Cephei variables
Cygnus (constellation)
Cygni, Omega1
Cygni, 45
195556
101138
7844
Cygni, V2014
Durchmusterung objects